Mariano Valdés Chávarri (1947 – 27 February 2021) was a Spanish cardiologist and academic.

Biography
Born in Madrid, Chávarri spent 35 years teaching in Murcia. He earned a doctoral degree in medicine from the University of Valencia and was the first to launch an angioplasty program in Spain for the treatment of myocardial infarction.

He retired in 2017 but continued private practice until his death.

Mariano Valdés Chávarri died of COVID-19 during the COVID-19 pandemic in Spain in El Palmar on 27 February 2021, at the age of 74.

References

1947 births
2021 deaths
People from Madrid
Spanish cardiologists
Deaths from the COVID-19 pandemic in Spain